Mário Daniel Gil Mateus (born 19 March 1992 in Lisbon) is a Portuguese footballer who plays for Futebol Benfica, as a midfielder.

Personal
His grandfather Marinho was a professional footballer.

External links
 

1992 births
Living people
Footballers from Lisbon
Portuguese footballers
Association football midfielders
Atlético Clube de Portugal players